D'Artagain "Doc" Wise (born August 8, 1967) is a former American football lineman who played for three seasons in the Arena Football League with the New Orleans Night and Arizona Rattlers. He played college football at the University of Nevada, Las Vegas.

References

External links
Just Sports Stats

Living people
1967 births
Players of American football from Los Angeles
American football offensive linemen
American football defensive linemen
UNLV Rebels football players
New Orleans Night players
Arizona Rattlers players